A pulmonary tractotomy is a surgical technique to treat a penetrating lung injury. The tract of the lung injury is opened, and open bronchi and blood vessels are ligated (sewn).


Treatment of penetrating lung injuries 

Emergency surgery for a penetrating lung injury, e.g. an accident or a gunshot, is associated with a very high mortality rate.

Such lung injuries cannot be treated with simple surgery; they cannot be oversewn. If treated with simple surgery, blood vessels within the tract of the lung injury may continue to bleed and result in a haematoma which should be avoided. Or the patient may suffer a pulmonary air embolism and subsequently die.

Penetrating lung injuries can be treated with a formal lung resection or with pulmonary tractotomy.

Comparison of treatments

Pulmonary tractotomy is a lung sparing technique. It can prevent the need for formal lung resection. Its advantages over segmental lung resection include that it can be performed quicker; it offers a rapid way to control bleeding (haemorrhage) and air leaks in patients with penetrating lung injuries. Also, pulmonary tractotomy can preserve healthy pulmonary tissue (parenchyma); this naturally is not possible with lung resection.

However, overall patient outcome is the same with pulmonary tractotomy and lung resection; both are viable surgical treatment options. This is because patient outcome in penetrating lung injury is related mainly to the severity of injury, rather than the type of treatment.

References

Emergency medical procedures

Pulmonary thoracic surgery